oMusic TV was a British music television channel. It was a classical/chill out music channel, and was available free-to-air on satellite. On 1 September 2010, oMusic TV was replaced by Vintage TV, a channel that plays music from the 1940s to the 1990s.

The channel consisted of classical, opera, chillout, ambient, vaporwave & world music.

The selection of the music videos played on oMusic were aided by interactive service (via the Green Button) technology and an SMS polling system.

Some oMusic programming later reappeared as a programming block within Open Access 3 before the channel's closure on 4 April 2011.

References

External links 
 Open Access

Television channels and stations established in 2007
Television channels in the United Kingdom
Classical music in the United Kingdom
Classical music television channels
Television channels and stations disestablished in 2010
Defunct television channels in the United Kingdom
Music video networks in the United Kingdom